Okey Amadi is a progressive politician in Rivers State, Nigeria. He was a member of the
Rivers State House of Assembly from 1999 to 2007, representing the constituency of Etche I for the
People's Democratic Party. Between 2011 and 2015, he served as Commissioner of the Rivers State Ministry of Energy and Natural Resources.

References

Living people
Members of the Rivers State House of Assembly
Rivers State Commissioners of Energy and Natural Resources
Rivers State Peoples Democratic Party politicians
People from Etche
All Progressives Congress politicians
Year of birth missing (living people)